The Richard Egan House, also known as Egan House or Judge Richard Egan House, is a historic home located in downtown San Juan Capistrano, California. It was listed on the National Register of Historic Places in 2017.

It was built by San Juan Capistrano contractor William English in 1883 for Richard Egan.  It is the only
Renaissance Revival-style house in San Juan Capistrano.

It was designed and constructed by Richard Egan who later became the city's judge. Egan, born in Ireland and studied in New York fell in love with San Juan Capistrano and decided to settle down and build a home. The house is a one-story structure built originally built in 1883 but was destroyed by fire and the current home was rebuilt in 1898. It has classic Victorian Architecture with brick walls and a white wooden patio porch. The building once served as courtroom for the town until Egan's death in 1923.

Since 2017, the building is home to Ellie's Table.  The bakery is an independent breakfast restaurant with a few other locations within southern Orange County. Inside the building are many artifacts from the town's late 19th and early 20th century history. Outside the building, facing west, are three historical markers. One indicating the property is listed on the National Register, another indicating it is a San Juan Capistrano historic site, and one with a few paragraphs of information regarding Richard Egan and his home.

References

External links

Ellie's Table, official site

National Register of Historic Places in Orange County, California
Bakeries of California